Tejas Airlines was a commuter airline based in San Antonio, Texas with scheduled passenger service operated to several destinations inside Texas.

History 
Tejas Airlines commenced operations in 1977 with service to five destinations in Texas and then expanded its flights to eight cities.

Destinations 

In 1979, Tejas Airlines was serving seven cities in Texas.

 Austin, TX (AUS)
 Brownsville, TX (BRO) 
 Corpus Christi, TX (CRP)
 Houston, TX Hobby Airport (HOU)
 Laredo, TX (LRD)
 McAllen, TX (MFE) 
 San Antonio, TX (SAT) - Hub and home base

Fleet 
Tejas operated the following aircraft throughout its lifetime.
 Fairchild Swearingen Metroliner Metro II
 Piper Navajo PA-31

Incidents and accidents 
13 August 1978 - At San Antonio, the Metro II commuter plane was refueled in the right wing with 125 gallons. After an 18-minute flight, while approaching Austin, the left engine failed due to fuel starvation. Failing to assure if the landing gear was down and locked, the crew continued their approach to runway 12R. After touchdown, the plane veered off the runway. It appeared that the crossflow valve had been off during the entire flight, thereby disabling fuel flow from the right wing tank to the fuel tank in the left wing.

Bankruptcy 
Tejas Airlines filed for Chapter 11 bankruptcy in December 1980.

See also 
 List of defunct airlines of the United States

References

Airlines established in 1977
1977 establishments in Texas
Airlines disestablished in 1981
1981 disestablishments in Texas
Companies that filed for Chapter 11 bankruptcy in 1980
Airlines based in Texas
Defunct airlines of the United States